The following lists events that happened during the year 2013 in Bosnia and Herzegovina.

Incumbents
Presidency:
Bakir Izetbegović 
Željko Komšić
Nebojša Radmanović
Prime Minister: Vjekoslav Bevanda

Events

February
 February 28 - The war crime convictions of Momčilo Perišić are overturned by a war crimes tribunal in The Hague, Netherlands. The Serbian general had been convicted and sentenced in 2011 for atrocities perpetrated both during wars in Croatia and Bosnia.

March
 March 29 - A Bosnian court sentences Veselin Vlahović to 45 years in jail for murders, tortures, rapes and lootings during the Bosnian War.

May
 May 29 - Former Bosnian official Jadranko Prlić is sentenced to 25 years in prison by the International Criminal Tribunal for the former Yugoslavia for war crimes during the Yugoslav Wars.
 May 30 - After a three-year trial, a U.N. tribunal in The Hague acquits two former Serbian security officials accused of committing war crimes and crimes against humanity during the 1990s Bosnian War.

August
 August 15 - Aleksandar Cvetković is extradited to Bosnia and Herzegovina for trial regarding the 1995 Srebrenica massacre.

 
Years of the 21st century in Bosnia and Herzegovina
2010s in Bosnia and Herzegovina
Bosnia and Herzegovina
Bosnia and Herzegovina